Russko-Osinovsky is a rural locality (a khutor) in Dudachenskoye Rural Settlement, Frolovsky District, Volgograd Oblast, Russia. The population was 30 as of 2010.

Geography 
Russko-Osinovsky is located 49 km northeast of Prigorodny (the district's administrative centre) by road. Dudachensky is the nearest rural locality.

References 

Rural localities in Frolovsky District